Goddard is a given name. Notable people with the name include:

Goddard Lieberson (1911–1977), American record producer and music industry executive
Goddard Oxenbridge (died 1537), English landowner and administrator
Goddard Pemberton (died 1616), English politician

See also
Goddard (surname)